The Tennessee Department of Safety and Homeland Security (TDOS), also known as the Tennessee Department of Safety or DOS, is a law enforcement agency serving the U.S. state of Tennessee. The TDOS is made up of three main divisions: the Tennessee Highway Patrol (THP), the Tennessee Driver License Services division, and the Tennessee Office of Homeland Security.

History
The TDOS was established in 1939 by the Tennessee General Assembly to exercise authority over the THP. Over the decades, the agency has evolved to meet new challenges, such as drug trafficking, the issuance of drivers' licenses, and terrorism. Therefore, the DOS currently comprises three divisions: the THP, the Driver License Services division, and the state Office of Homeland Security (OHS).

The current commissioner of the Department of Safety is Jeff Long, who has been serving since January 2019 after being appointed by Governor Bill Lee. He is assisted by deputy and assistant commissioners, including the director of the Tennessee Highway Patrol, Col. Dereck Stewart.

Functions

The DOS manages the THP, OHS, and the Driver License Services division. The THP is the highway patrol agency for Tennessee, which has jurisdiction anywhere in the state.  The Office of Homeland Security was created in April 2003 by an executive order by then-Governor Phil Bredesen in the aftermath of September 11, 2001. The Driver License Services division issues various kinds of identification cards, including hardship licenses for minors, graduated drivers licenses, regular driver licenses, commercial driver licenses, and state identification cards.  In addition to the above functions, the DOS has issued handgun permits through the THP since October 1996, assuming the role previously taken by local sheriffs' offices.

References

Safety